Findon may refer to:

Places
Findon, Aberdeenshire or Finnan, a fishing village in Scotland
Findon, South Australia, a suburb of Adelaide
Findon, West Sussex, a village in England

People
 Andrew Findon, British flautist

See also
 Findern, Derbyshire
 Finedon, Northamptonshire